Sander Pärn (born 19 February 1992) is a former Estonian rally driver.

Career
Pärn won the Drive DMACK Cup in 2014 WRC season with Welsh co-driver, James Morgan. He was awarded 6 WRC-2 rallies with Ford Fiesta R5 for the 2015 season.

Career results

WRC results

JWRC results

Drive DMACK Cup results

WRC 2 results

References
Profile at eWRC-results.com

1992 births
Living people
Estonian rally drivers
Place of birth missing (living people)
World Rally Championship drivers
Miina Härma Gymnasium alumni